Santamans is a surname. Notable people with the surname include:

Anna Santamans (born 1993), French swimmer
Daniel Santamans (1959–2008), French rugby union player and coach
 (born 1977), Catalan illustrator